Ali Zein Mohamed (born 14 December 1990) is an Egyptian handball player for CS Dinamo Bucuresti and the Egyptian national team.

Club career
He started his career at Al Ahly, then he played for Étoile Sportive du Sahel, Al Jazira, Pays d'Aix Université Club and Sharjah, before joining Barcelona in July 2021, where he won the 2021–22 EHF Champions League. After one season he transferred to Dinamo București.

International career
He played for Egypt U20 at the 2009 Junior World Championship and 2011 Junior World Championship.

He won the 2013 Mediterranean Games, and the African Championship in 2016, 2020 and 2022 with Egypt. He also represented Egypt at the World Men's Handball Championship in 2013, 2015, 2019, 2021 and 2023, and in the 2016 and 2020 Summer Olympics.

Honours
Club
Al Ahly
 Egypt Handball Cup: 2009
 Arab Handball Championship of Champions: 2010
 African Handball Champions League: 2012
 Egyptian Handball League: 2012–13
 African Handball Cup Winners' Cup: 2013

Étoile du Sahel
 Tunisian Handball Cup: 2013–14

Al Jazira
 UAE Handball League: 2015–16
 UAE President's Handball Cup: 2015–16

Sharjah
 UAE Handball League: 2018–19, 2019–20, 2020–21
 UAE President's Handball Cup: 2018–19, 2019–20, 2020–21

Barcelona
 EHF Champions League: 2021–22
 Liga ASOBAL: 2021–22
 Copa del Rey: 2021–22
 Copa ASOBAL: 2021–22
 Supercopa ASOBAL: 2021–22

International
Egypt
 Mediterranean Games: 2013
 African Championship: 2016, 2020, 2022; runner-up 2018

Individual
 Best Player at the 2018 African Championship
 Best Left Back at the 2020 African Championship
 Best Left Back at the 2022 African Championship

References

External links

1990 births
Living people
Egyptian male handball players
Place of birth missing (living people)
Handball players at the 2016 Summer Olympics
Olympic handball players of Egypt
Expatriate handball players
Egyptian expatriate sportspeople in France
Egyptian expatriate sportspeople in the United Arab Emirates
Egyptian expatriate sportspeople in Spain
Egyptian expatriate sportspeople in Romania
Liga ASOBAL players
FC Barcelona Handbol players
Handball players at the 2020 Summer Olympics
CS Dinamo București (men's handball) players
Competitors at the 2013 Mediterranean Games
Mediterranean Games gold medalists for Egypt
Mediterranean Games medalists in handball
21st-century Egyptian people